Afentis Christos ("Lord Christ") is a small islet off the northern coast of the Greek island of Crete named after the small chapel built there. The islet and chapel is only a short distance away from the beach at Malia and a short distance from the islet of Agia Varvara. Afentis Christos is administered from Malia in Heraklion regional unit.

References

Landforms of Heraklion (regional unit)
Uninhabited islands of Crete
Islands of Greece